Mixta Cave is a natural cave located on the eastern side of Ramla Bay. It is very commonly confused with Calypso's Cave which is located on the other side of the same bay. It has become increasingly crowded by both Maltese nationals and tourists raising ecological concerns.

References 

Caves of Malta
Nadur
Gozo